Canadian International School of Hong Kong (CDNIS) is an international school in Aberdeen, Hong Kong. Founded in 1991, the school provides an education for over 1,800 students representing more than 40 nationalities from Early Years 1 to Grade 12. CDNIS is one of seven International Baccalaureate (IB) World Schools in Hong Kong authorised to deliver three IB programmes – the Diploma Programme (DP), Middle Years Programme (MYP) and Primary Years Programme (PYP). In addition to the IB Diploma Programme, students are also eligible to receive the Ontario Secondary School Diploma upon graduation. The language of instruction is English, with Mandarin, French, and Spanish taught as second languages. Additionally, the Early Years programme now supports two teaching streams: Bilingual and International. In the Bilingual stream, students will receive equal instruction in both Mandarin and English. Whereas the international stream will focus on English with some Mandarin instruction. The Bilingual program is planned to commence in the 2022 school year in both Early Years 1 and 2 while the Preparatory programme will commence the Bilingual program in the 2023 school year. The Head of School is Dr. Jane Camblin. The school celebrated its 25th anniversary during the 2016–2017 school year. The school received its full IB re-authorisation in 2018 and full CIS/WASC accreditation in 2018. Over the summer of 2019, the school installed 349 solar panels on two of the school's roofs - making CDNIS’ photovoltaic farm the largest solar farm of any school on Hong Kong Island.

Lower School

The Principal of the Lower School is Mr. Lief Erickson and the Vice Principals are Zoe Heggie (Early Years 1 – Grade 1), and DJ MacPherson (Grade 2–5). Students from Early Years 1 to Grade 5 are part of the Lower School and makeup just over 60% of the student body. Students in Early Years 1 and Early Years 2 attend school for either the morning or afternoon session, while Prep to Grade 5 students attend school all-day.

Students as young as three and four-years-old attend the half-day Early Years 1 and Early Years 2, programmes, designed to provide an introduction to school life. While the International Baccalaureate's Primary Years Programme (PYP) is officially used from Early Years 1, students also take part in regular Mandarin, performing arts and physical education classes, which are taught by specialist teachers. In August 2019, the school unveiled its Early Years Environment (EYE), a purpose-built environment for the school's youngest learners.

Upper School

The Upper School consists of students from Grades 6 to 12, with a current enrollment of just over 820 students, making up almost 40% of the student body. Students in Grades 5–9 take part in the Middle Years Programme (MYP), while students in Grade 10–12 take part in the Diploma Programme (DP). The Principal of the Upper School is Dr. Timothy Kaiser and the Vice Principals of the Upper School are Duff Douglas (Student Life and Leadership), David Butler (Academics) and Nathalie Millette (Transition Years).

Starting in August 2020, CDNIS began the Middle Years Programme (MYP) in Grade 6.

CDNIS has one of the largest DP cohorts in Hong Kong. 99% of the 110 students in the Class of 2020, the 10th cohort of IB graduates, were awarded the IB Diploma. Two students were awarded a maximum of 45 points out of 45, while 41 students achieved a score of 40 or above. The Class of 2020 IB score average was 38 points. In 2021, six students were awarded a maximum score of 45, while 54 students achieved a score of 40 or above, and 10 students achieved a near perfect score of 44; thirteen students achieved the IB Bilingual Diploma. The class average of 2021 was 40 points.

History

Canadian International School of Hong Kong was founded in 1991 by a group of Canadians living in Hong Kong who volunteered their time to establish an international school offering the Canadian curriculum. When the school first opened its doors to the first 81 students, the school campus was located in a small rented facility in Causeway Bay.

By 1994 it became popular with international families wishing to expose their children to Chinese languages in their education.

The school continued to grow, and by 1999 has reached the "through-train" objective, providing education from Reception to Grade 12. The school produced its first graduates at the end of the 1998/1999 school year. During the 1999 school year, Canadian International School moved to its present location Aberdeen, being architecturally designed with a uniquely Canadian style and spirit. CDNIS was and remains to this day a non-profit organisation.

Construction of Aberdeen Campus
The school campus, designed by Canadian architect Norman Grey-Noble, was built in three main phases over a period of several years. The first phase, often referred to as the main building and used mainly by the Upper School, includes floors one to nine completed in 1999. Along with numerous classrooms on every level except the first floor. A swimming pool is located on the first floor, two gymnasiums and an outdoor playground are on the third floor, a design studio, the main school cafeteria and another outdoor playing surface, which is covered in artificial turf, is on the sixth floor and the main school office is on the ninth floor.

The second phase, which was finished in 2002, is used mainly by the Lower School and includes floors nine to 14. Besides numerous classrooms, this area also includes the school library, a science and innovation lab (The Hive), a covered playground on the 11th floor, and another cafeteria on the 12th floor. The third phase, the Leo Lee Arts Centre (LLAC), was completed in the spring of 2008. The LLAC is a HK$100 million facility with a 604-seat auditorium and teaching facilities for music, drama, dance and visual arts. The fourth phase includes the Green Roof Garden and Chinese Cultural Centre, which were completed in August 2015 In August 2019, the school created the Early Year Environment (EYE) and installed 349 solar panels to create the 2nd largest Photovoltaic Farm on Hong Kong Island. Following the summer of 2020, the school unveiled its newly renovated main cafeteria and its newly renovated spaces for Grade 5 and 6 students as part of its Transition Years Programme.

Curriculum
By 1994 the school added studies of Chinese culture to its curricula, and the school had instruction in the Cantonese language.

Notable alumni
Raz Gal-Or - Israeli social media figure active in China

See also

 Canadians in Hong Kong
 Consulate General of Canada in Hong Kong and Macao

References

External links
Official Website
Leo Lee Arts Centre
CISPA Parent Association

Educational institutions established in 1991
International schools in Hong Kong
International Baccalaureate schools in Hong Kong

Hong Kong
1991 establishments in Hong Kong